Sock! is an album by saxophonist Gene Ammons compiling sessions recorded between 1954 and 1962 and released on the Prestige label in 1965.

Reception
AllMusic awarded the album 1½ stars with its review by Scott Yanow stating: "Sock! is basically a mess. The ten brief songs are strung together with no thought given to sound or segues, and the material itself is pretty weak". The more modern tracks 1-3 are the best and can be found on the Stranger In Town CD.

Track listing
 "Blue Coolade" (Mal Waldron) – 4:11
 "Short Stop" (Waldron) – 3:30
 "They Say You're Laughing at Me" (Jerry Livingston) – 3:59
 "Scam" (Gene Ammons) – 5:35
 "Sock" (Ammons) – 2:45
 "What I Say" – 2:45
 "Count Your Blessings" (Richard Morgan, Edith Temple) – 4:15
 "Cara Mia" (Lee Lange, Tulio Trapani) – 2:50
 "Blues for Turfers" (Edwin Moore) – 3:45
 "Rock Roll" (Chico O'Farrill) – 2:55
Recorded at Van Gelder Studio in Hackensack, New Jersey on November 26, 1954 (tracks 5-8) and November 4, 1955 (tracks 9 & 10) and at Van Gelder Studio, Englewood Cliffs New Jersey on April 13, 1962 (track 4) and September 5, 1962 (tracks 1-3)

Personnel
Gene Ammons – tenor saxophone
Nat Howard (tracks 5-8), Nat Woodyard (tracks 9, 10) – trumpet
Henderson Chambers (tracks 5-8), Edwin Moore (tracks 9, 10) – trombone
Gene Easton (tracks 5-8), Cecil Payne (tracks 9, 10) – baritone saxophone
Patti Bown (track 4), John Houston (tracks 5-8), Mal Waldron (tracks 1-3), Lawrence Wheatley (tracks 9, 10) – piano
George Duvivier (track 4), Wendell Marshall (tracks 1-3), Ernie Shapherd (tracks 9, 10), Ben Stuberville (tracks 5-8) – bass
George Brown (tracks 5-10), Walter Perkins (track 4), Ed Thigpen (tracks 1-3) – drums
Etta Jones – vocals (track 4)

References

Gene Ammons albums
1965 albums
Prestige Records albums